George Edwards (12 July 1927 – 15 August 1991) was an  Australian rules footballer who played with Hawthorn in the Victorian Football League (VFL).

Notes

External links 

1927 births
1991 deaths
Australian rules footballers from Victoria (Australia)
Hawthorn Football Club players
Ivanhoe Amateurs Football Club players